Azadi Chowk ("Liberty Interchange"; also known as Minar-e-Pakistan Chowk, "Minar-e-Pakistan Interchange"), is a large elevated roundabout in Lahore, capital of Punjab, Pakistan. Azadi Chowk is near the Minar-e-Pakistan monument, where the ceremony of the Pakistan Resolution was conducted, resulting in the creation of Pakistan. As one of the Lahore's major entry points, the interchange is usually busy.

Statistics

Roads in Lahore